The first elections to South Ribble Borough Council were held in June 1973. The elected Borough Council, newly created by the Local Government Act 1972, would act as a shadow authority before coming into its powers later in 1973. The whole council was up for election and the Conservative Party won a majority.

Election result

|}

Ward Results

Notes

References
 The Elections Centre, South Ribble Borough Council Election Results (PDF)

1973 English local elections
1973
1970s in Lancashire